Build a Bridge may refer to:

"Build a Bridge", a song by Limp Bizkit from their 2003 album Results May Vary
"Build a Bridge", a song by Mavis Staples from her 2017 album If All I Was Was Black